The 15th Regiment, Tennessee Infantry was an infantry regiment from Tennessee that served with the Confederate States Army in the American Civil War. Among its notable battles were the Battle of Shiloh and the Battle of Chickamauga.

Company G, of the regiment was composed largely of residents of states outside Tennessee.  Besides men from Tennessee, Missouri, and Kentucky, the company (originally named the "Illinois Company") included soldiers from the consistently Union states of Illinois, Minnesota, and Pennsylvania.

See also
List of Tennessee Confederate Civil War units

References

Illinois in the American Civil War
Kentucky in the American Civil War
Minnesota in the American Civil War
Missouri in the American Civil War
Pennsylvania in the American Civil War
Units and formations of the Confederate States Army from Tennessee
Military units and formations disestablished in 1865
1865 disestablishments in Tennessee